The  Nastro d'Argento (Silver Ribbon) for Best Director is a film award bestowed annually as part of the Nastro d'Argento awards since 1946, organized by the Italian National Association of Film Journalists (Sindacato Nazionale dei Giornalisti Cinematografici Italiani or SNGCI), the national association of Italian film critics.

This is the list of Nastro d'Argento awards for Best Director. Federico Fellini is the record holder with seven Nastro d'Argento awards for Best Director received from 1954 to 1984 (also the only one awarded in two consecutive editions, in 1954 in 1955 for the films I vitelloni and La Strada), followed by Luchino Visconti, Gianni Amelio and Giuseppe Tornatore, with four awards each.

1940s 
1946  
 Alessandro Blasetti -  Un giorno nella vita 
 Vittorio De Sica - Shoeshine 
1947 - Roberto Rossellini - Paisan
1948
 Alberto Lattuada - Flesh Will Surrender
 Giuseppe De Santis - Tragic Hunt 
1949 - Vittorio De Sica - Bicycle Thieves

1950s 
1950 - Augusto Genina - Heaven over the Marshes
1951 - Alessandro Blasetti - Prima comunione
1952 - Renato Castellani - Two Cents Worth of Hope
1953 - Luigi Zampa - The City Stands Trial
1954 - Federico Fellini - I Vitelloni
1955 - Federico Fellini - La Strada
1956 - Michelangelo Antonioni - Le Amiche
1957 - Pietro Germi - The Railroad Man
1958 - Federico Fellini - Nights of Cabiria
1959 - Pietro Germi - A Man of Straw

1960s 
1960 - Roberto Rossellini - General della Rovere
1961 - Luchino Visconti - Rocco and His Brothers
1962 - Michelangelo Antonioni - La Notte
1963
Nanni Loy - The Four Days of Naples
Francesco Rosi - Salvatore Giuliano
1964 - Federico Fellini - 8½
1965 - Pier Paolo Pasolini - The Gospel 
According to St. Matthew
1966 - Antonio Pietrangeli - Io la conoscevo bene
1967 - Gillo Pontecorvo - The Battle of Algiers
1968 - Elio Petri - We Still Kill the Old Way
1969 - Franco Zeffirelli - Romeo and Juliet

1970s 
1970 - Luchino Visconti - The Damned
1971 - Elio Petri - Investigation of a Citizen Above Suspicion
1972 - Luchino Visconti - Death in Venice
1973 - Bernardo Bertolucci - Last Tango in Paris
1974 - Federico Fellini - Amarcord
1975 - Luchino Visconti - Conversation Piece
1976 - Michelangelo Antonioni - The Passenger
1977 - Valerio Zurlini - The Desert of the Tartars
1978 - Paolo and Vittorio Taviani - Padre Padrone
1979 - Ermanno Olmi - The Tree of Wooden Clogs

1980s 
1980 - Federico Fellini - City of Women
1981 - Francesco Rosi - Tre fratelli
1982 - Marco Ferreri - Tales of Ordinary Madness
1983 - Paolo and Vittorio Taviani - The Night of the Shooting Stars
1984
Pupi Avati - Una gita scolastica
Federico Fellini - And the Ship Sails On
1985 - Sergio Leone - Once Upon a Time in America
1986 - Mario Monicelli - Speriamo che sia femmina
1987 - Ettore Scola - The Family
1988 - Bernardo Bertolucci - The Last Emperor
1989 - Ermanno Olmi - The Legend of the Holy Drinker

1990s 
1990 - Pupi Avati - The Story of Boys & Girls
1991 - Gianni Amelio - Open Doors
1992 - Gabriele Salvatores - Mediterraneo
1993 - Gianni Amelio - The Stolen Children
1994 - Nanni Moretti - Caro diario
1995 - Gianni Amelio - Lamerica
1996 - Giuseppe Tornatore - The Star Maker
1997 - Maurizio Nichetti - Luna e l'altra
1998 - Roberto Benigni - Life Is Beautiful
1999 - Giuseppe Tornatore - The Legend of 1900

2000s 
2000 - Silvio Soldini - Bread and Tulips
2001 - Nanni Moretti - The Son's Room
2002 - Marco Bellocchio - My Mother's Smile
2003 - Gabriele Salvatores - I'm Not Scared
2004 - Marco Tullio Giordana - The Best of Youth
2005 - Gianni Amelio - The Keys to the House
2006 - Michele Placido - Romanzo Criminale
2007 - Giuseppe Tornatore - The Unknown Woman
2008 - Paolo Virzì - Tutta la vita davanti
2009 - Paolo Sorrentino - Il Divo

2010s 
2010 - Paolo Virzì - The First Beautiful Thing
2011 - Nanni Moretti - Habemus Papam
2012 - Paolo Sorrentino - This Must Be the Place
2013 - Giuseppe Tornatore - The Best Offer
2014 - Paolo Virzì - Human Capital
2015 - Paolo Sorrentino - Youth
2016 - Paolo Virzì - Like Crazy
2017 - Gianni Amelio - Tenderness
2018 - Matteo Garrone - Dogman
2019 - Marco Bellocchio - The Traitor
2020 - Matteo Garrone - Pinocchio
2021 - Emma Dante - The Macaluso Sisters
2022 - Mario Martone - Nostalgia and The King of Laughter

See also 
 David di Donatello for Best Director
 Cinema of Italy

References

External links 
 Italian National Syndicate of Film Journalists official site  

Director
Awards for best director